The Cadiseni were an ancient tribe of Hephtalites that lived in Garchistan even before the appearance of the Xionites.

History 
The Hungarian linguist Janos Harmatta wrote:Consequently, from among the "hostile peoples" the second tribe were the Cadiseni, well known in Greco-Roman and Eastern sources. Later, the Cadiseni were ascribed to the Hephthalites, and they played an important role in the events of the 6th century AD. However, some of them were attested already around 440 AD, when they settled in the area of Singara and Nisibis and, possibly, at an even earlier date refers to the testimony of Ibn Khordadbeh, according to which it was Ardashir I who conferred the title "shah" on Taziyan shah, Kadis-shah and Bardjan-shah. The authenticity of this testimony regarding Taziyan Shah and Barjan Shah has already been recognized by earlier studies, since Taziyan Shah was identified with the Arab king of Hira, while Barjan Sah was compared to Varuchan shah from the Manichaean texts, who may have been a ruler of the Varachan country, belonging to the Kushanshahr. According to Procopius, "The Cadiseni, who were fighting at that moment under the command of Pityaxes, suddenly rushed in large numbers, defeated their enemy and, strongly crowded together, killed many of them. When this was noticed by the people under the command of Sunicas and Aigan (both Massagetae (Huns) by origin), they rushed at them at full speed. But first, three hundred Geruli, under the command of Pharas, entered the rear of the enemy from a height and made a wonderful demonstration of valor against all of them, and especially against the Cadiseni. And the Persians, seeing that the troops of Sunicas were already advancing on them from the flank, turned to a hasty flight. And the defeat became complete, because here the Romans joined forces with each other, and the barbarians staged a great massacre. At least three thousand people died on the right wing of the Persians, and the rest with difficulty went into the phalanx and were saved. And the Romans did not continue the pursuit, but both sides stood facing each other in a line. This was the course of these events."

Notes 

Hephthalites
Ancient tribes